The 29th Infantry Brigade Combat Team is an infantry brigade combat team of the United States Army National Guard of Hawaii. It traces its origins to the 29th Infantry Brigade (Separate) originally formed in the Hawaii Army National Guard in 1959. The current name and Table of Organisation and Equipment, adopting the new "Brigade Combat Team" structure, was adopted in 2006.

History
The 29th Infantry Brigade headquarters was converted and redesignated from the 120th Signal Support Company on 15 January 1959 at Fort Ruger. A separate brigade, the 29th replaced the 299th Regimental Combat Team under the Pentomic reorganization as the major unit of the Hawaii Army National Guard. The brigade included the 1st and 2nd Battle Groups of the 299th Infantry, formed from the 299th Regimental Combat Team, and the 284th Transportation Company (Light Truck). The 120th Signal Support Company, constituted on 15 September 1953, had been organized and Federally recognized on 4 January 1954 at Fort Ruger. The brigade conducted its first two-week summer training at Schofield Barracks between 13 and 27 June 1959. During the Vietnam War, the brigade was ordered into active Federal service on 13 May 1968 and released from Federal service on 12 December 1969.

The 29th Infantry Brigade Combat Team is the largest unit in the Hawaii Army National Guard (HI ARNG). Since 1995, the brigade has been one of the nation's 15 enhanced readiness brigades. This distinction means that the 29th must be trained and equipped to deploy within 90 days of a federal call-up. The brigade has units located on the islands of Hawaii, Maui, Oahu, Molokai, and Kauai, and in the states of Arizona, and California.

The Brigade's Headquarters and Headquarters Company, 229th Military Intelligence Company, and 29th Support Battalion are located on Oahu at its Kalaeloa facilities, formerly known as Barbers Point Naval Air Station. The bulk of the 227th Engineer Company's heavy engineering equipment which is located in the Hawaii Army National Guard Pearl City complex on Oahu. A combat engineering detachment is situated in the community of Keaau on the island of Hawaii. The brigade's 1st Battalion, 487th Field Artillery can be found in Wahiawa in Central Oahu.

The units of the brigade's 1st Squadron, 299th Cavalry, are located in communities throughout the state. The battalion's headquarters and headquarters company is located in Hilo, Hawaii, with a scout platoon detached to Kaunakakai, Molokai. The bulk of the battalion's Company A is located on Kauai in Kapaa, with a detachment in Hanapepe. Company B of the battalion is similarly split between the communities of Kealakekua and Honokaa on the island of Hawaii. Companies C and D are located in Kahului, Maui, and Wahiawa, Oahu, respectively.

On 20 July 2004 more than 2,100 soldiers were ordered to report for active duty 16 August 2004, about a month earlier than expected, to begin preparations for a year of combat duty in Iraq. With six months of training time on the mainland and at least a year in Iraq, the Hawaii soldiers were to be away 18 months. By late February 2005 the 29th Brigade replaced the 81st Brigade of the Washington Army National Guard, whose major elements were north of Baghdad in Balad.

The brigade returned to the United States between late December 2005 and early January 2006.  It was demobilized in March 2006. After returning from Iraq, the brigade became the modular 29th Infantry Brigade Combat Team.

On 16 October 2016, a ceremony was held in Joint Base Elmendorf-Richardson, AK to activate 1st Battalion, 297th Infantry Regiment (AK ARNG).  This new battalion was attached to the 29th IBCT with an effective date of 1 September 2016.

Order of battle
1st Battalion, 158th Infantry Regiment (Arizona Army National Guard)
1st Battalion, 294th Infantry Regiment (Guam Army National Guard)
1st Battalion, 297th Infantry Regiment (Alaska Army National Guard)
1st Squadron, 299th Cavalry Regiment (Hawaii Army National Guard)
1st Battalion, 487th Field Artillery Regiment (1-487th FAR)
29th Brigade Support Battalion (29th BSB)
227th Brigade Engineer Battalion (227th BEB) (activated in 2014 from 29th BSTB)

References

Citations

Bibliography 
 
GlobalSecurity.org: 29th Infantry Brigade
The Institute of Heraldry: 29th Infantry Brigade

29
29
Military units and formations established in 1959